The 2020 Nadeshiko League was the 32nd season of the Nadeshiko League, the main league for women's association football in Japan. It was also the 16th season in its current format.

The league was originally scheduled to begin on 2 May 2020 but was delayed due to the COVID-19 pandemic. The league was finally rescheduled to begin on 18 July 2020 with the first two rounds of matches played behind closed doors.

Division 1

The season started on 18 July 2020 and ended in November 2020 with the play-offs to be held days later. Prior to the league start date, PCR were carried out on all the players and staffs of the teams participating in the leagues to check their health conditions, almost all test cases came out negative

Urawa Reds Ladies won their fourth Nadeshiko League title and therefore will earn the right to participate in the 2021 AFC Women's Club Championship.

This is its final year as the highest division of the Japan women's football league system as the WE League is set to commence next year. Similar to the men's J. League in 1992 and the English women's FA WSL in 2011, not all Division 1 clubs will be admitted to the new league.

Teams
The league was contested by 10 teams, debutants Ehime winners of the 2019 Nadeshiko League Division 2 and runners up Cerezo Osaka replaced Nittidai and AC Nagano Parceiro Ladies, who were relegated from the 2019 Nadeshiko League Division 1.

Table

Results

Positions by round

Attendance

Average attendance

Highest attendance

Statistics

Topscorers

Awards

Best XI

Division 2

The season began on 18 July 2020.

Teams and format
10 teams contested the league, Jumonji Ventus were promoted while Shizuoka Sangyo were relegated from the previous season, additionally Nittaidai and Nagano Parceiro Ladies also joined from the Nadeshiko League Division 1.

League table

Results

Statistics

Top scorers

Awards

Challenge League

12 teams contested the third tier, divided into two groups of 6 each for East and West. Newly promoted clubs were Shizuoka SSU Asregina (formerly Iwata Bonita) and Fukuoka J. Anclas, both returning to the national tiers, and Cerezo Osaka Sakai Girls, Cerezo Osaka Sakai Ladies's B-team.

Teams

Challenge League Championship

JFA Academy wins the title.

Challenge League Third Place

Speranza is promoted to the Nadeshiko League.

References

External links
 2020 Nadeshiko League Division 1 at Soccerway.

Nadeshiko League seasons
1
L
Japan
Japan